The New Jersey version of the NWA United States Tag Team Championship was a professional wrestling tag team championship contested for in the New Jersey-based National Wrestling Alliance (NWA) promotion. The title was only contestable by tag teams in tag team matches. The title was established on February 3, 1996 by NWA Jersey, in which The Lost Boys (Yar and Wolf) won a Triangle tag team match against The Greek Connection (Gus the Greek and Jimmy Londos) and Bad Attitude (Seek and Destroy). This title is one of at least five championships that share the same name under the NWA's supervision. On April 7, 2000, the final champions The Pitbulls (#1 and #2) lost the titles to Chris Candido and Tommy Cairo; however, the NWA reversed the decision and instead of returning the titles to The Pitbulls, the promotion retired the championship for unknown reasons.

Overall, there have been 17 reigns that have occurred in the United States. From the information known, The Misfits (Derek Domino and Harley Lewis)' fourth reign was the longest in the title's history, at 204 days; their and Downward Spiral (Adrian Hall and Twiggy Ramirez)'s first reigns, respectively, were the shortest, at 21 days. In addition to reigns held by wrestlers, there was one vacant reign, in which the title had to be stripped from the champions.

Title history

See also

List of National Wrestling Alliance championships

References

National Wrestling Alliance championships
Tag team wrestling championships
Professional wrestling in New Jersey